James Nash Siedow (June 12, 1920 – November 20, 2003) was an American actor, best known for his role of Drayton "The Cook" Sawyer in The Texas Chain Saw Massacre and its sequel The Texas Chainsaw Massacre 2.

Life and career
Siedow was born in Cheyenne, Wyoming. He began acting in his high school drama class, and later on, moved to New York City, where he started appearing in theatre productions. During World War II, Siedow served with the Army Air Forces, and after the war, Siedow moved to Chicago, Illinois and started doing radio work. In September 1946, he met and married an actress named Ruth, his wife up to his death. They had three children.

They moved to Houston, Texas soon after their marriage where Siedow continued acting, creating one of Houston's original local community theatres. He directed Houston's first production of Who's Afraid of Virginia Woolf? by Edward Albee. In 1971, Siedow appeared in his first movie, an obscure one titled The Windsplitter, playing a character named Mr Smith. He followed this with his most famous role as Drayton Sawyer in the cult film The Texas Chain Saw Massacre in 1974.

His other movie roles were as Howard Ives in the TV movie Red Alert in 1977, an unnamed role in the 1980 movie Hotwire, and as Drayton Sawyer, again, in The Texas Chainsaw Massacre 2, the sequel to The Texas Chain Saw Massacre.

Death 
Siedow died in Houston from emphysema complications in 2003, at the age of 83.

Filmography

References

External links

1920 births
2003 deaths
Male actors from Wyoming
American male film actors
United States Army Air Forces personnel of World War II
Deaths from emphysema
People from Cheyenne, Wyoming
United States Army Air Forces soldiers
20th-century American male actors